Grant Decker (February 4, 1814 – July 30, 1890) was the first mayor of the village (now City) of Flint, Michigan serving from 1855 to 1856.  He was a merchant, miller and in the lumber businesses at some time in his life.

Early life
Decker was born in Deckertown, Sussex County, New Jersey on February 4, 1814. He came to Flint, Michigan, in 1839 to work in the lumbering industry.  With the Honorable Artemas Thayer, he built a flour mill. Later in association with Captain Ira H. Wilder, he owned interests in a flour and feed mill.  Over his time in Flint, eight fires hit his various businesses.

Political
In 1855 Decker was elected Mayor of the Village of Flint serving until 1856.

Post-Political
On July 30, 1890, Decker died in Flint with interment in Glenwood Cemetery, Flint.

References

1814 births
1890 deaths
Burials at Glenwood Cemetery (Flint, Michigan)
Mayors of Flint, Michigan
People from Sussex, New Jersey
Politicians from Sussex County, New Jersey

19th-century American politicians